Below are the squads for the 2011 Toulon Tournament. Each team had to submit 20 players.

Players marked in bold have been capped at full International level.

Group A

Head coach: Eduardo Lara Lozano

Head coach: Jacobus Adriaanse

Head coach: Ciro Ferrara

Head coach: Ilídio Vale

Group B

Head coach: Su Maozhen

Head coach: Pierre Mankowski

Head coach: Antal Róth

Head coach: Juan Carlos Chávez

Footnotes

 

Toulon Tournament squads
Squad